Sulfonamide or sulphonamide may refer to:

Sulfonamide (chemistry) – the sulfonamide functional group in organic chemistry
Sulfonamide (medicine) – the group of sulfonamide antibacterial drugs.